Plin may refer to:
A Northern Italian pasta dish, similar to Agnolotti
Perilipin-1 also known is PLIN, a protein found in humans